Malika-Dina Akulova (born 19 December 1995), known professionally as Malika Dina (Малика Дина) is a Kyrgyzstani singer.

Biography
Malika Dina was born on 19 December 1995 in Moscow, the daughter of pop singer Dinara Akulova. She is the youngest of the three daughters and followed in her mother's footsteps. Malika Dina gave birth to a daughter on 24 October 2015.

Discography
Studio albums
Kızganamın (2021)

EP
Jürösüŋ Jürögümdö (2021)

References 

1995 births
Living people
Ethnic Kyrgyz people (individuals)
Kyrgyzstani women singers
Singers from Moscow
21st-century Kyrgyzstani women